The socialist market economy (SME) is the economic system and model of economic development employed in the People's Republic of China. The system is a market economy with the predominance of public ownership and state-owned enterprises. The term "socialist market economy" was introduced by Jiang Zemin during the 14th National Congress of the Chinese Communist Party (CCP) in 1992 to describe the goal of China's economic reforms. Originating in the Chinese economic reforms initiated in 1978 that integrated China into the global market economy, the socialist market economy represents a preliminary or "primary stage" of developing socialism. Some commentators describe the system as a form of "state capitalism", while others describe it as an original evolution of Marxism, in line with Marxism–Leninism similar to the "New Economic Policy" of the Soviet Union, adapted to the cohabitation with a globalized capitalist system.

Description 
The economic reform toward a socialist market economy is underpinned by the Marxist framework of historical materialism. In the late 1970s, then-Chairman Deng Xiaoping and the CCP leadership rejected the prior Maoist emphasis on culture and political agency as the driving forces behind economic progress and started to place a greater emphasis on advancing the material productive forces as the fundamental and necessary prerequisite for building an advanced socialist society. The adoption of market reforms was seen to be consistent with China's level of development and a necessary step in advancing the productive forces of society. This aligned Chinese policy with a more traditional Marxist perspective where a fully developed socialist planned economy can only come into existence after a market economy has exhausted its historical role and gradually transforms itself into a planned economy, nudged by technological advances that make economic planning possible and therefore market relations less necessary.

The socialist market economy is presented by the CCP as an early stage in the development of socialism (this stage is variously called the "primary" or "preliminary" stage of socialism), where public ownership coexists alongside a diverse range of non-public forms of ownership. The CCP maintains that despite the co-existence of private capitalists and entrepreneurs with public and collective enterprise, China is not a capitalist country because the party retains control over the direction of the country, maintaining its course of socialist development. Proponents of this economic model distinguish it from market socialism as market socialists believe that economic planning is unattainable, undesirable or ineffective and thus view the market as an integral part of socialism whereas proponents of the socialist market economy view markets as a temporary phase in development of a fully planned economy.

Cui Zhiyuan traces the theoretical foundations of the socialist market economy to James Meade's model of liberal socialism in which the state acts as a residual claimant on the profits generated by state-owned enterprises that are operated independent of government management.

Proponents initially advocated a socialist market economy as a necessary stage for the development of the economy to a point where a planned socialist economy would become possible. Recent Chinese leaders including Xi Jinping (General Secretary of the Party from November 2012) have described the building of the "socialist market economy with Chinese characteristics" as the goal without any reference to a post-market socialist economy.

History 

After the Great Leap Forward (1958–1961) and the ousting of the Gang of Four from power in 1976, Chairman Deng Xiaoping (paramount leader from 1978 to 1989) refocused China's efforts on economic growth and on finding an economic system compatible with China's specific conditions. However, in doing so he remained committed to the Leninist model of centralized political control and a one-party state.

Jiang Zemin originally introduced the term "socialist market economy" in 1992. He had coined the idea so that China could learn the lessons from capitalist countries without needing to discuss if the reforms are "socialist" or "capitalist." Jiang had asked Deng Xiaoping if he had approved of the term, which he did. The Đổi Mới in the Socialist Republic of Vietnam later adopted the concept. Following its implementation, this economic system has supplemented the centrally planned economy in the People's Republic of China, with high growth-rates in GDP during the past decades having been attributed to it. Within this model, privately owned enterprises have become a major component of the economic system alongside the central state-owned enterprises and the collective/township village enterprises.

The transition to a socialist market economy began in 1978 when Deng Xiaoping introduced his program of socialism with Chinese characteristics. Initial reforms in decollectivising agriculture and opening the economy to foreign investment in the late 1970s and early 1980s later led to large-scale radical reforms, including corporatization of the state sector, partial privatisation of some enterprises, liberalisation of trade and prices and dismantling of the "iron rice bowl" system of job security in the late 1990s. With Deng Xiaoping's reforms, China's GDP rose from some US$150 billion in 1978 to more than $1.6 trillion in 2004, with an annual increase of 9.4 percent.

Analysis 
Some scholars have described China's economic system as a form of state capitalism, particularly after the industrial reforms of the 1980s and 1990s, noting that while the Chinese economy maintains a large state sector, the state-owned enterprises operate like private-sector firms and retain all profits without remitting them to the government to benefit the entire population. This model brings into question the rationale for widespread public ownership as well as the applicability of the descriptor "socialist", and has led to concern and debate regarding the distribution of state profits. Others have labeled it "party-state capitalism."

Starting in 2017 as part of its state-owned enterprise reform program, the central government began to encourage state-owned enterprises to start paying dividends to the government. Other reforms have transferred state-owned assets to social-security funds to help finance pensions, and the Shenzhen municipal government has proposed using their state-owned enterprises to finance a social dividend-type of system for its residents.

Chinese economist Cui Zhiyuan argues that James Meade's model of liberal socialism is similar to China's socialist market economy and can be used to make sense of the model. Meade's model of market socialism involved public ownership of firms with independent management - with the state acting as a residual claimant to the profits generated by its enterprises, but without exercising control rights over the management and operations of its firms. This model has the advantage that the state would have a source of income independent of taxation and debt, enabling a reduction of the tax burden on individual incomes and the private sector while promoting greater equality. Cui points to the Chongqing experience with municipal state-owned enterprises enabling high social expenditure alongside low taxes and extremely high rates of growth as validation of the socialist market economy model. The Chongqing model used state enterprise profits to fund public services (including housing), providing the main source of public finance and enabling Chongqing to lower its corporate tax rate (15% compared to the 33% national corporate tax rate) to attract foreign investment.

Julan Du and Chenggang Xu analyzed the Chinese model in a 2005 paper to assess whether it represents a type of market socialism or capitalism. They concluded that China's contemporary economic system represents a form of capitalism rather than market socialism because: (1) financial markets exist which permit private share ownership—a feature absent in the economic literature on market socialism; and (2) state profits are retained by enterprises rather than being distributed among the population in a social dividend or similar scheme, which are central features in most models of market socialism. Du and Xu concluded that China is not a market socialist economy, but an unstable form of capitalism. 

Another analysis carried out by the Global Studies Association at the DePaul University in 2006 reports that the Chinese economic system does not constitute a form of socialism when socialism is defined as a planned economy where production for use has replaced production for profit as the driving force behind economic activity, or when socialism is defined as a system where the working class is the dominant class which controls the surplus value produced by the economy. The Chinese economy also does not constitute socialism in the sense of widespread self-management or workplace democracy. The study concluded that as of 2006 capitalism is not the dominant mode of organization either and China instead has a partially pre-capitalist agrarian system with almost 50% of its population engaged in agricultural work.

In 2015 Curtis J. Milhaupt and Wentong Zheng classified China's economic system as state capitalism because the state directs and guides all major aspects of the Chinese economy—including both the state and private sectors—while not collecting dividends from the ownership of its enterprises. They noted that Chinese state-owned enterprises and privately owned enterprises shared many similarities with respect to state subsidies, proximity to state power and execution of government policy objectives. Within the state sector, the emphasis was more on government control than on the ownership of assets.

Proponents of the socialist market economy compare it to the New Economic Policy in 1920s Soviet Russia that introduced market-oriented reforms while maintaining state-ownership of the commanding heights of the economy. The reforms are justified through the belief that changing conditions necessitate new strategies for socialist development.

According to Li Rongrong, in 2003 the chairman of the State-Owned Assets Supervision and Administration Commission of the State Council, China's socialist economic system is underpinned by the foundational role of public enterprise: 

Other Marxist analyses point out that because the Chinese economic system is based on commodity production, has a role for private capital and disempowers the working class, it represents a capitalist economy. Classical Marxists believe a socialist commodity economy (or a socialist market economy) is contradictory. Other socialists believe the Chinese have embraced many elements of market capitalism, specifically commodity production and privatisation, resulting in a full-blown capitalist economic system.
In the past, although many enterprises were nominally publicly owned, the profits were retained by the enterprises and used to pay managers excessively high salaries rather than being distributed amongst the population. This old status quo is no longer the case, as part of Xi Jinping's anti-corruption campaign, SOE executives have faced 50% pay cuts, the "commanding role" of the CCP over SOEs has been cemented in law and SOEs have been required to have Staff and Worker Representative Congresses (SWRCs), a form of workplace democracy, with 80% of registered companies in China having them, including some private sector companies.

Characteristics

Enterprise and ownership types 
Public ownership in the socialist market economy consists of state-owned assets, collectively owned enterprises and the publicly owned shares of mixed enterprises. These various forms of public ownership play a dominant role in the socialist market economy alongside substantial private and foreign enterprises.

There are a few major forms of state-owned enterprises in China today:
 State-owned enterprises: commercial enterprises established by either the central government or a local government, where managers are appointed by the government or public bodies. This category only includes wholly state-funded and managed firms. Most state-owned enterprises are not entities of the central government. Central government state-owned enterprises are subunits of the State-owned Assets Supervision and Administration Commission (SASAC).
 State-holding enterprises: state-holding, or state-controlled enterprises, are publicly listed firms where the state owns a large share or a controlling share within the firms, thereby exerting influence on the management of the firm. These include firms that receive foreign direct investment.
 State joint ownership enterprises:

State sector 
The socialist market economy consists of a wide range of state-owned enterprises (SOE) that represent one form of public ownership. Beginning with the 1978 reforms, in the 1980s during the industrial reforms state enterprises were gradually corporatised and transformed into joint-stock corporations with the state retaining either full or majority ownership of their shares. By the early 2000s, most major SOEs in non-strategic sectors were listed on the Shanghai and Hong Kong stock exchanges and some SOEs adopted mixed ownership structures where the central government and various other state entities—including state banks, other SOEs, provincial and local governments—own varying degrees of the firm's listed shares alongside foreign and private shareholders. The result has been a highly diffuse form of public ownership where state-owned enterprises are owned by various different government entities, agencies and other state-owned enterprises. This makes gauging the true size and scope of the state sector difficult, particularly when SOEs with mixed ownership structures are taken into account. In 2013, the public sector accounted for 30% of the number of firms in China, but 55% of assets, 45% of revenue and 40% of profits.

In 1996, China implemented a comprehensive series of industrial reforms termed "Grasping the large, letting go of the small". These reforms involved closing unprofitable state enterprises, merging smaller enterprises and privatization of other small-to-medium enterprises. Centrally owned SOEs were reformed into joint-stock companies with the aim of delegating more authority to SOE managers. SOEs at all levels shifted their primary focus to profitability and shed their social welfare function of providing social services and benefits to their workers in what was known as the "Iron Rice Bowl" system. The State-owned Assets Supervision and Administration Commission (SASAC) was formed in 2003 to oversee the management of the large centrally owned state enterprises.

Modern SOEs are operationally very different from those in the 1990s. SOEs are much larger in size and fewer in number, with central government-owned SOEs clustered in "strategic sectors" including banking, finance, mining, energy, transportation, telecommunications and public utilities. By comparison, provincial and municipal level SOEs number in the thousands and are involved in almost every industry including information technology and automobiles design and production. State sector reform is an ongoing process in China. As of 2017, the CCP has rejected the Singapore model of Tamasek-style state investment companies for China's SOEs, where SOEs operate solely to maximize profits on a commercial basis. In particular, China maintains that centrally owned SOEs also pursue national and industrial policy objectives. As a result of recent reforms to increase profitability and unload debt, the government reported the profits of central government-owned SOEs rose by 15.2% in 2017.

Despite becoming increasingly profitable, SOEs in China have not paid dividends to the state, causing some analysts question the rationale for public ownership in the first place. As part of SASAC's ongoing reforms, SOEs will now be encouraged and required to pay a higher portion of their profits as dividends to the state, with some state-owned assets being transferred to social security funds to help finance pensions for China's aging population. This is part of a broader reform effort of restructuring the state sector to become a source of finance for public services. As part of the SOE reform goals outlined in 2015 by SASAC, SOEs are to be classified as either commercial or public service entities, with the former being required to distribute a higher proportion of their profits as dividends. Dividend payments are set to rise from 5–15% to 30% by 2020.

Private sector 
Privately owned enterprises (POEs) are recognized as one of the components of the socialist market economy alongside state, collective and individually owned enterprises. The private sector has played an increasingly large role since the adoption of the 1994 Company Law. Additionally, the boundary between public and private enterprises have blurred in China as many publicly listed firms are under mixed ownership by various state and non-state entities. Additionally, private sector firms that operate in industries targeted for growth often receive favorable loans and preferential government treatment while SOEs in non-strategic sectors might be exempt from subsidies. As an example, ZTE Corporation is a majority state-owned enterprise that was forced to rely on equity markets whereas its employee-owned private sector competitor Huawei is viewed as a "national champion" and therefore received major state funding from state banks. Like their state-owned counterparts POEs are expected to follow state policies and are subject to party control, suggesting that the distinction between public and private ownership is not a meaningful distinction to make for understanding China's economic model. As of 2015, state control and state-directed development (in both public and private sectors) is the overriding feature of the Chinese economic system that plays a more substantial role than the public ownership of assets.

While the private sector has been accorded a role in the socialist market economy and has greatly increased in size and scope since the 1990s, the private sector does not dominate the Chinese economy. The exact size of the private sector is difficult to determine in part because private enterprises may have a minority of their stock owned by state entities and because of different classification standards used for classifying enterprises. For example, in the first quarter of 2016 the National Bureau of Statistics of China reported fixed investment by private firms at 35%, and by wholly state-owned SOEs at 27%, with the bulk of the remainder belonging to non-wholly state funded limited liability corporations.

Economic planning 
By the early 1990s, Soviet-type economic planning had been replaced with market relations and markets became the fundamental driving force in the socialist market economy, with the State Planning Commission being reformed into the National Development and Reform Commission in 2003. Indicative planning and industrial policies have substituted material balance planning and play a substantial role in guiding the market economy for both the state and private sectors. The planning system consists of three layers, with each layer using a different planning mechanism.

Compulsory planning is limited to state-owned enterprises operating in strategic sectors, including research, education and infrastructure development plans. Compulsory planning outlines targeted outcomes and the supply of raw materials and financial resources needed. Contractual planning sets objectives and the overall means of achieving these goals and then negotiates with enterprises and local governments to establish detailed objectives and how resources are to be allocated to the targeted sectors. Indicative planning operates at the lowest level of the planning system, where the government outlines industrial targets and then uses market instruments (tax exemptions, subsidies and favorable bank loans) to induce firms in the targeted industry to meet these targets.

See also 

 Cooperative
 Dirigism
 East Asian model of capitalism
 Economy of China
 Free market
 Mixed economy
 Socialism in one country
 Socialist-oriented market economy
 State capitalism

References

Further reading 
 
 
 
 
 
 

Socialism
Economy of China
Market socialism
Mixed economies
Ideology of the Chinese Communist Party
Jiang Zemin